Gloioxanthomyces is a genus of fungi in the family Hygrophoraceae. It was circumscribed in 2013 to contain G. nitidus, and the type species, G. vitellinus. Within the Hygrophoracae, it is in the tribe Chromosereae and closely related to the genus Chromosera. The generic name derives from the Greek gloio ("glutinous"), xantho ("yellow"), and myces (fungus).

See also
List of Agaricales genera

References

Hygrophoraceae
Agaricales genera